A chain-free property is a property that is being sold by a vendor (home seller) who does not need to purchase a new property after they sell. Only 10% of all property transactions in the United Kingdom are chain-free.

Origins of the term 
The term 'property chain' is common in real estate, especially in the UK. The chain is the line of people buying and selling. For example, there might be a  first-time buyer trying to purchase a small flat, another person waiting to move from the flat to a small house, another person waiting to move from the small house to a larger house, and so on. If one person drops out of the chain, the sellers are not able to continue with their moves and the chain collapses.

Reasons for chain-free properties 
Chain-free properties are available for numerous reasons:
 Homeowner reasons – the current homeowner has already a new home to move to, the seller is not buying a new home, emigration, selling on behalf of a deceased relative
 Financial institutions (lenders, banks and building societies) – after acquiring properties thorough repossession, probate or equity release, they are re-sold on the open market. As the seller is a company, not a private individual, there is no property chain.
 Home builders – properties that have been acquired in a part-exchange transaction and are being re-sold on the open market. As above, the vendor is a company, not a private individual, so there is no property chain.
 Professional Investors – properties that have been acquired as part of a portfolio, not for the owner to reside in, but as investments. Although a private individual, the vendor is selling for business reasons, not to enable them to move on, making the property sale chain-free.

Recent rise in volumes and popularity among home buyers 
The sale of chain-free properties has risen in the past two years, mainly due to the rising number of properties being repossessed in light of the credit crunch. After repossessing properties, lenders look to sell the properties on so they can unlock the cash tied up in them and use it to rebuild their damaged mortgage books. With house prices falling in the past two years, these properties are usually priced to sell quickly to limit any losses on the properties.

Therefore, there are obvious benefits in purchasing a chain-free property:

 They are priced to sell in a short timeframe, making them usually slightly below the general market value.
 Unlike a traditional purchase, where the ability of a ‘chain’ of buyers and sellers to move affects a purchase, there are only two parties involved in the purchase of a chain-free property – the buyer and the seller – making it a much simpler transaction.

See also 
Estate agent
Foreclosure

References

Real estate terminology